TRNA-dihydrouridine20 synthase (NAD(P)+) (Dus2p, tRNA-dihydrouridine synthase 2) is an enzyme with systematic name tRNA-5,6-dihydrouracil20:NAD(P)+ oxidoreductase. This enzyme catalyses the following chemical reaction

 5,6-dihydrouracil20 in tRNA + NAD(P)+  uracil20 in tRNA + NAD(P)H + H+

This enzyme specifically modifies uracil20 in tRNA.

References

External links 
 

EC 1.3.1